The 2011–12 Macedonian Third Football League was the 20th season of the third-tier football league in the Republic of Macedonia, since its establishment. It began in August 2011 and ended in June 2012.

North

League table

South

League table

East

League table

West

League table

Southwest

League table

See also
2011–12 Macedonian Football Cup
2011–12 Macedonian First Football League
2011–12 Macedonian Second Football League

External links
MacedonianFootball.com
Football Federation of Macedonia 

Macedonia 3
3
Macedonian Third Football League seasons